Jill Catherine Pipher (born December 14, 1955 in Harrisburg, Pennsylvania) was the president of the American Mathematical Society. She began a two-year term in 2019. She is also the past-president of the Association for Women in Mathematics (AWM, 2011–2013), and she was the first director of the Institute for Computational and Experimental Research in Mathematics (ICERM, 2011–2016), an NSF-funded mathematics institute based in Providence, Rhode Island.

Contributions
Pipher's work has been in harmonic analysis, Fourier analysis, partial differential equations, and cryptography.  She has published more than 50 research articles and has coauthored with Jeffrey Hoffstein and Joseph Silverman a textbook titled An Introduction to Mathematical Cryptography.

Education and career
Pipher is currently the Elisha Benjamin Andrews Professor of Mathematics at Brown University.  She received a B.A. from the University of California, Los Angeles in 1979 and a PhD from UCLA in 1985 under the direction of John B. Garnett. She taught at the University of Chicago (1985–1990) before taking a position at Brown in 1990, where she served as chair of the Mathematics Department from 2005 to 2008.

In 1996, Pipher, along with Jeffrey Hoffstein, Daniel Lieman and Joseph Silverman, founded NTRU Cryptosystems, Inc. to market their cryptographic algorithms, NTRUEncrypt and NTRUSign.

Recognition
In 2012 she became a fellow of the American Mathematical Society.  In 2017, she was selected as a fellow of the Association for Women in Mathematics in the inaugural class. In 2019 she was named a SIAM Fellow "for her profound contributions in analysis and partial differential equations, groundbreaking work in public key cryptography, and outstanding scientific leadership". She was named to the 2021 class of Fellows of the American Association for the Advancement of Science.

In 2014 Pipher was a Mathematical Association of America Invited Lecturer at the Joint Mathematics Meetings, speaking on The Mathematics of Lattice-based Cryptography The Association for Women in Mathematics named her as their Noether Lecturer for 2018.

In 2017, she was elected to a two-year term as president of the American Mathematical Society, to begin in 2019.

References

External links
Jill Pipher's home page
Five Questions With: Jill Pipher

Living people
1955 births
American women mathematicians
University of California, Los Angeles alumni
20th-century American mathematicians
21st-century American mathematicians
Fellows of the American Mathematical Society
Fellows of the Association for Women in Mathematics
Fellows of the Society for Industrial and Applied Mathematics
Fellows of the American Association for the Advancement of Science
Mathematicians from Pennsylvania
Presidents of the American Mathematical Society
20th-century women mathematicians
21st-century women mathematicians
Brown University faculty
20th-century American women
21st-century American women